Rob Smith in an American baseball coach and former outfielder. He played college baseball at Vincennes for two seasons, then completed his eligibility at Indiana–Southeast before completing his degree at Indiana University Bloomington in 1998. He then spent a year as an assistant coach at Purdue in 1999, and returned to the Boilermakers from 2001 through 2006. Smith was hired as Associate Head Coach at Creighton. He was hired as head coach at Ohio in June 2012, retiring in January 2021.

Head coaching record

References

External links
Ohio Bobcats bio

Living people
Creighton Bluejays baseball coaches
Indiana–Southeast Grenadiers baseball players
Ohio Bobcats baseball coaches
Purdue Boilermakers baseball coaches
Vincennes Trailblazers baseball players
Year of birth missing (living people)